Clinton Falls is an unincorporated community in Clinton Falls Township, Steele County, Minnesota, United States.

The community is located between Medford and Owatonna near Interstate 35 and Steele County Road 9.  Crane Creek and the Straight River meet near Clinton Falls.

Clinton Falls was platted in 1855. A post office was established at Clinton Falls in 1857, and remained in operation until 1933.

References

Unincorporated communities in Minnesota
Unincorporated communities in Steele County, Minnesota
1855 establishments in Minnesota Territory
Populated places established in 1855